Velloorkunnam is a village in Muvattupuzha in Ernakulam district in the Indian state of Kerala.

Demographics
 India census, Velloorkunnam had a population of 11,576.

References

Villages in Ernakulam district